This a detailed discography of American singer-songwriter Bill Callahan. All of his work was released under the alias Smog, except where noted.

Cassettes 
Macramé Gunplay (1988)
Cow (1989)
A Table Setting (1990)
Tired Tape Machine (1990)

Albums 
All released under the name "Smog" except those that mention otherwise.

Compilations 
Accumulation: None (released under the alias (Smog) on November 5, 2002, by Drag City / Domino)
Blind Date Party (collaborative double album with Bonnie "Prince" Billy released on December 10, 2021)

EPs

Live recording 
Rough Travel for a Rare Thing (2010)
Bill Callahan Live at Third Man Records (2018)

Singles

Other appearances

Studio appearances

Guest appearances

Collaborations

References 

Strong, Martin C.: The Great Alternative & Indie Discography, 1999, Canongate, 

Discographies of American artists
Rock music discographies